Agres is a town and municipality in the comarca of Comtat, in the province of Alicante, Valencian Community, Spain.

It is situated between the Serra de Mariola and the Serra d'Agullent. It is bordered by Agullent, Benissoda and Albaida to the north; Muro d'Alcoi and Cocentaina to the east; Alfafara to the west and Alcoi to the south.

See also 
 Serra Mariola Natural Park

References

External links

 Índice de Estadística Municipal del municipio de Agres. Unidad de Documentación de la Diputación de Alicante 
 Datos y cifras de los municipios de la provincia de Alicante. Unidad de Documentación de la Diputación de Alicante 
 Web de la Diputación Provincial de Alicante 

Municipalities in the Province of Alicante
Comtat